Zhao Bingjun (1859 – February 26, 1914) was the third premier of the Republic of China from 25 September 1912 to 1 May 1913. Zhao was previously a public security official during the Qing dynasty and became minister of the interior during the republic before becoming premier.  He was directly implicated in the assassination of Song Jiaoren, the man most likely to be his successor.  The murder was most likely ordered by the provisional president, Yuan Shikai, who was angry that Song wanted to fill the cabinet with Nationalists that would obstruct Yuan's policies.  Zhao protested his and Yuan's innocence but resigned to protect Yuan's government.  He was made governor of Zhili.  Zhao was mysteriously poisoned in 1914, most likely by Yuan to prevent him from leaking more details of Song's death to the press.

See also
 Premier of the Republic of China

1859 births
1914 deaths
Republic of China politicians from Henan
Premiers of the Republic of China
Chinese police officers
Politicians from Pingdingshan
Deaths by poisoning
Qing dynasty politicians from Henan
People murdered in China
1914 murders in China